

Australia
 Christmas Island
Administrator – Francis Charles Boyle, Administrator of Christmas Island (1977–1980)
 Cocos (Keeling) Islands
Governor – John Cecil Clunies-Ross, Governor of the Cocos (Keeling) Islands (1947–1978)
Administrator – Charles Ivens Buffett, Administrator of Cocos (Keeling) Islands (1977–1981)
 Norfolk Island
 Administrator – Desmond Vincent O'Leary, Administrator of Norfolk Island (1976–1979)
 Head of Government – William Arthur Blucher, President of the Island Council of Norfolk Island (1976–1978)

Denmark
 Faroe Islands
High Commissioner – Leif Groth, High Commissioner in the Faroe Islands (1972–1981)
 Prime Minister – Atli Dam, Prime Minister of the Faroe Islands (1970–1981)
 Greenland
Governor – Hans Lassen, Governor of Greenland (1973–1979)

France
 French Polynesia
 High Commissioner – Paul Cousseran, High Commissioner of the Republic in French Polynesia (1977–1981)
 Mayotte
 Prefect –
 Jean Coussirou, Prefect of Mayotte (1976–1978)
 Jean Rigotard, Prefect of Mayotte (1978–1980)
 President of the General Council – Younoussa Bamana, President of the General Council of Mayotte (1976–1991)
 New Caledonia
 High Commissioner –
 Gabriel Ériau, Governor of New Caledonia (1974–1978)
 Claude Charbonniaud, Governor of New Caledonia (1978–1981)
 New Hebrides  – condominium together with the United Kingdom
British Resident Commissioner –
 John Stuart Champion (1975–1978)
 Andrew Christopher Stuart (1978–1980)
French Resident Commissioner –
 Robert Gauger (1974–1978)
 Bernard Pottier (1978)
 Jean-Jacques Robert (1978–1980)
Chief Minister –
 George Kalsakau, Chief Minister of New Hebrides (1977–1978)
 Gérard Leymang, Chief Minister of New Hebrides (1978–1979)
 Saint Pierre and Miquelon
 Prefect – Pierre Eydoux, Prefect of Saint Pierre and Miquelon (1977–1979)
 President of the General Council – Albert Pen, President of the General Council of Saint Pierre and Miquelon (1968–1984)
 Wallis and Futuna
 Administrator-Superior – Henri Beaux, Administrator Superior of Wallis and Futuna (1976–1979)
 President of the Territorial Assembly –
 Pasilio Tui, President of the Territorial Assembly of Wallis and Futuna (1977–1978)
 Manuele Lisiahi, President of the Territorial Assembly of Wallis and Futuna (1978–1984)

New Zealand
 Cook Islands
 Queen's Representative – Sir Gaven Donne, Queen's Representative of the Cook Islands (1975–1984)
 Prime Minister –
 Albert Henry, Prime Minister of the Cook Islands (1965–1978)
 Tom Davis, Prime Minister of the Cook Islands (1978–1983)
 Niue
 Premier – Robert Rex, Premier of Niue (1974–1992)
 Tokelau
 Administrator – Frank Corner, Administrator of Tokelau (1975–1984)

Portugal
 Macau
 Governor – José Garcia Leandro, Governor of Macau (1974–1979)

South Africa
 South West Africa
Administrator-General – Marthinus T. Steyn, Administrator-General of South West Africa (1977–1979)

United Kingdom
 Antigua
Governor – Sir Wilfred Jacobs, Governor of Antigua (1967–1993)
Premier – Vere Bird, Premier of Antigua (1976–1994)
 Belize
Governor – Peter Donovan McEntee, Governor of Belize (1976–1980)
Premier – George Cadle Price, Premier of Belize (1961–1984)
 Bermuda
 Governor – Sir Peter Ramsbotham, Governor of Bermuda (1977–1980)
 Premier – David Gibbons, Premier of Bermuda (1977–1982)
 British Virgin Islands
 Governor –
 Walter Wilkinson Wallace, Governor of the British Virgin Islands (1974–1978)
 James Alfred Davidson, Governor of the British Virgin Islands (1978–1982)
 Chief Minister – Willard Wheatley, Chief Minister of the British Virgin Islands (1971–1979)
 Brunei
High Commissioner –
 James Alfred Davidson, British High Commissioner in Brunei (1975–1978)
 Arthur Christopher Watson, British High Commissioner in Brunei (1978–1984)
Sultan – Hassanal Bolkiah, Sultan of Brunei (1967–present)
Chief Minister – Pengiran Dipa Negara Laila Diraja Pengiran Abdul Mumin, Chief Minister of Brunei (1972–1981)
 Cayman Islands
 Governor – Thomas Russell, Governor of the Cayman Islands (1974–1982)
 Dominica 
gained independence on 3 November 1978
Governor – Sir Louis Cools-Lartigue, Governor of Dominica (1968–1978)
Premier – Patrick John, Prime Minister of Dominica (1974–1979)
 Ellice Islands
gained independence as Tuvalu on 1 October 1978
 Commissioner – Thomas H. Laying, Commissioner of Ellice Islands (1975–1978)
 Chief Minister – Toaripi Lauti, Chief Minister of Ellice Islands (1975–1981)
 Falkland Islands
 Governor – Sir James Roland Walter Parker, Governor of the Falkland Islands (1977–1980)
 Gibraltar
 Governor –
 Sir John Grandy, Governor of Gibraltar (1973–1978)
 Sir William Jackson, Governor of Gibraltar (1978–1982)
 Chief Minister – Sir Joshua Hassan, Chief Minister of Gibraltar (1972–1987)
 Gilbert Islands
Governor –
 John Hilary Smith, Governor of Gilbert and Ellice Islands (1973–1976) and, separately of the Gilbert Islands and Tuvalu from 1976 to 1978.
 Reginald James Wallace, Governor of Gilbert Islands (1978–1979)
Chief Minister –
 Naboua Ratieta, Chief Minister of Gilbert and Ellice Islands (1974–1976), Chief Minister of Gilbert Islands (1976-1978)
 Ieremia Tabai, Chief Minister of Gilbert Islands (1978–1979)
 Guernsey
 Lieutenant-Governor – Sir John Martin, Lieutenant-Governor of Guernsey (1974–1980)
 Bailiff – Sir John Loveridge, Bailiff of Guernsey (1973–1982)
 Hong Kong
 Governor – Sir Murray MacLehose, Governor of Hong Kong (1971–1982)
 Isle of Man
 Lieutenant-Governor – Sir John Warburton Paul, Lieutenant-Governor of Man (1974–1980)
 Head of Government – Clifford Irving, Chairman of the Executive Council of the Isle of Man (1977–1981)
 Jersey
 Lieutenant-Governor – Sir Desmond Fitzpatrick, Lieutenant-Governor of Jersey (1974–1979)
 Bailiff – Sir Frank Ereaut, Bailiff of Jersey (1975–1985)
 Montserrat
 Governor – Gwilyum Wyn Jones, Governor of Montserrat (1977–1980)
 Chief Minister –
 Percival Austin Bramble, Chief Minister of Montserrat (1970–1978)
 John Osborne, Chief Minister of Montserrat (1978–1991)
 New Hebrides  – condominium together with France
British Resident Commissioner –
 John Stuart Champion (1975–1978)
 Andrew Stuart (1978–1980)
French Resident Commissioner –
 Robert Gauger (1974–1978)
 Bernard Pottier (1978)
 Jean-Jacques Robert (1978–1980)
Chief Minister –
 George Kalsakau, Chief Minister of New Hebrides (1977–1978)
 Gérard Leymang, Chief Minister of New Hebrides (1978–1979)
 Pitcairn Islands
 Governor – Sir Harold Smedley, Governor of the Pitcairn Islands (1976–1980)
 Magistrate – Ivan Christian, Magistrate of the Pitcairn Islands (1975–1984)
 Saint Christopher-Nevis-Anguilla
 Governor – Sir Probyn Ellsworth–Innis, Governor of Saint Christopher-Nevis-Anguilla (1975–1981)
 Premier –
 Robert Bradshaw, Premier of Saint Christopher-Nevis-Anguilla (1966–1978)
 Paul Southwell, Premier of Saint Christopher-Nevis-Anguilla (1978–1979)
 Saint Helena and Dependencies
 Governor – Geoffrey Colin Guy, Governor of Saint Helena (1976–1981)
 Saint Lucia
 Governor – Sir Allen Montgomery Lewis, Governor of Saint Lucia (1974–1980)
 Premier – John Compton, Premier of Saint Lucia (1964–1979)
 Saint Vincent and the Grenadines
 Governor – Sir Sydney Gun-Munro, Governor of Saint Vincent and the Grenadines (1976–1985)
 Premier – Milton Cato, Premier of Saint Vincent and the Grenadines (1974–1984)
 Solomon Islands
gained independence on 7 July 1978
Governor – Sir Colin Allan, Governor of the Solomon Islands (1976–1978)
Chief Minister – Peter Kenilorea, Chief Minister of the Solomon Islands (1976–1981)
 Turks and Caicos Islands
 Governor –
 Arthur Christopher Watson, Governor of the Turks and Caicos Islands (1975–1978)
 John Clifford Strong, Governor of the Turks and Caicos Islands (1978–1982)
 Chief Minister – James Alexander George Smith McCartney, Chief Minister of Turks and Caicos Islands (1976–1980)

United States
 American Samoa
Governor –
 H. Rex Lee, Governor of American Samoa (1977–1978)
 Peter Tali Coleman, Governor of American Samoa (1978–1985)
 Guam
 Governor – Ricardo Bordallo, Governor of Guam (1975–1979)
 Puerto Rico
 Governor – Carlos Romero Barceló, Governor of Puerto Rico (1977–1985)
 Trust Territory of the Pacific Islands
 High Commissioner – Adrian P. Winkel, High Commissioner of the Trust Territory of the Pacific Islands (1977–1981)
 Northern Mariana Islands (autonomous territory)
 Governor – Carlos S. Camacho, Governor of the Northern Mariana Islands (1978–1982)
 United States Virgin Islands
 Governor –
 Cyril King, Governor of US Virgin Islands (1975–1978)
 Juan Francisco Luis, Governor of US Virgin Islands (1978–1987)

References

Colonial governors
Colonial governors
1978